Odostomia acuta is a species of sea snail, a marine gastropod mollusc in the family Pyramidellidae, the pyrams and their allies.

Description

The shell is rather solid, but semitransparent and lustrous, with microscopic close spiral striae, and still more minute, flexuous, crowded growth lines. The shell is whitish with a tinge of flesh-color. There are six whorls besides the embryonic ones. The periphery is obtusely keeled. The umbilicus is conspicuous but small. The tooth is strong and prominent. The outer lip is occasionally striate within.

Distribution
This species occurs in the following locations:
 Angola
 Atlantic Europe
 Azores Exclusive Economic Zone
 Belgian Exclusive Economic Zone
 European waters (ERMS scope)
 Greek Exclusive Economic Zone
 Irish Exclusive economic Zone
 Mediterranean Sea
 Morocco
 Portuguese Exclusive Economic Zone
 Spanish Exclusive Economic Zone
 United Kingdom Exclusive Economic Zone
 Wimereux

References

External links
 
 To Biodiversity Heritage Library (59 publications)
 To CLEMAM
 To Encyclopedia of Life
 To GenBank
 To Marine Species Identification Portal
 To USNM Invertebrate Zoology Mollusca Collection

acuta
Gastropods described in 1848
Molluscs of the Atlantic Ocean
Molluscs of the Mediterranean Sea